Pasamum Nesamum is a 1964 Indian Tamil-language film directed by D. Yoganand. The film stars Gemini Ganesan and B. Saroja Devi. It is a remake of the Hindi film Anari (1959). The film was released on 26 January 1964.

Plot

Cast 
This list was adapted from the book Thiraikalanjiyam.

Male cast
Gemini Ganesan
M. R. Radha
K. D. Santhanam
Nagesh 
Vijayan
Eswar
Mahalingam
Balakrishnan

Female cast
B. Saroja Devi
M. V. Rajamma
Chandrakantha
Sasikala
Jyothi
Nalini
Revathi
Vimala

Production 
The film was produced by V. M. Sundar under the banner Alankar Pictures and was directed by D. Yoganand. The screenplay was written by Makkalanban.

Soundtrack 
Music was composed by Vedha and the lyrics were penned by Kannadasan.

References

External links 

1960s Tamil-language films
Films directed by D. Yoganand
Films scored by Vedha (composer)
Tamil remakes of Hindi films